The Gangala-na-Bodio Hunting Reserve is a hunting reserve in the Democratic Republic of the Congo. The reserve adjoins Garamba National Park.

During the study of the condition of elephants in the reserve, 1202 were counted.

References

Protected areas of the Democratic Republic of the Congo
Haut-Uélé
Northern Congolian forest–savanna mosaic